Road signs in Canada may conform to the Manual of Uniform Traffic Control Devices for Canada (MUTCDC) by the Transportation Association of Canada (TAC) for use by Canadian jurisdictions.  Although it serves a similar role to the MUTCD from the US Federal Highway Administration, it has been independently developed and has a number of key differences with its American counterpart, most notably the inclusion of bilingual (English/French) signage for jurisdictions such as New Brunswick with significant anglophone and francophone population, and a heavier reliance on symbols rather than text legends.

Language
Signs for the most part employ one or two languages: English, French or both. However, some signs are trilingual, incorporating English, French and an indigenous language such as Cree.

Stop sign

In practice, however, it can be empirically observed (for instance, with Google Street View) that  predominates in French-speaking areas (i.e., most of the geographic extent of Quebec), while  can be found in majority English-speaking areas such as Montreal's West Island suburbs. However, it was later officially determined by the OQLF that  is a valid French word in this context, and the older dual  +  usage is therefore not considered bilingual but merely redundant and therefore deprecated. All newly installed signs thus use either one word or the other, but not both.

The province of New Brunswick  has bilingual  in English-speaking areas. Acadian regions of Nova Scotia and Prince Edward Island also have bilingual signs.  Some areas in Manitoba and Ontario also have bilingual signs. Entry points to the country through Canada Customs and other federally-regulated sites (including airports) also have bilingual stop signs. On First Nations or Inuit territories, stop signs sometimes use the local aboriginal language in addition to or instead of English and/or French. Other parts of Canada use .

Canadian road signs 

The following are samples of Canadian road signs.

Gallery of stop signs

Gallery of other signs
Alphanumeric reference IDs from the Manual of Uniform Traffic Control Devices for Canada are included.

British Columbia road signs

Ontario road signs 

The Ministry of Transportation of Ontario (MTO) also has historically used its own MUTCD which bore many similarities to the TAC MUTCDC.  However, as of approximately 2000, MTO has been developing the Ontario Traffic Manual (OTM), a series of smaller volumes each covering different aspects of traffic control (e.g., sign design principles).

Sign classification 
The Ontario Traffic Manual Committee categorizes all road signs into two main categories: freeway and non-freeway sign types. Signs are then subcategorized into two additional groups: urban and rural.

Examples of Ontario regulatory and warning road signs

Quebec road signs 

The following are samples of Quebec road signs. A notable difference between Quebec road signs and those of the rest of Canada is Quebec's use of a white chevron on a red background to mark road alignment around a curve, whereas the remainder of the country employs a black chevron on a yellow background.

Quebec gallery

Superseded signs 
These signs have been superseded but can still be seen in some places.

See also 
 Comparison of traffic signs in English-speaking countries
 Glossary of road transport terms
 Road signs in the United States
 Traffic sign
 Warning sign

References

External links 
Government of Quebec traffic control devices library - Extensive list of all road signs and signals from the Quebec Transport Ministry 
Road Signs in Ontario, from the Ontario Ministry of Transportation.
Traffic Signs & Pavement Marking, from the British Columbia Ministry of Transportation and Infrastructure

 
Signs